The Second Biesheuvel cabinet was the executive branch of the Dutch Government from 9 August 1972 until 11 May 1973. The cabinet was formed by the christian-democratic Catholic People's Party (KVP), Anti-Revolutionary Party (ARP) and Christian Historical Union (CHU) and the conservative-liberal People's Party for Freedom and Democracy (VVD) after the fall of the previous Cabinet Biesheuvel I. The cabinet was a centre-right caretaker government and had a minority in the House of Representatives. Protestant Leader Barend Biesheuvel of the Anti-Revolutionary Party served as Prime Minister. Prominent Catholic politician Roelof Nelissen served as Deputy Prime Minister and Minister of Finance and former Liberal Leader Molly Geertsema served as Deputy Prime Minister and Minister of the Interior. The rump cabinet served until the election of 1972.

Formation
Following the fall of the First Biesheuvel cabinet the Democratic Socialists '70 (DS'70) left the coalition and the Catholic People's Party, People's Party for Freedom and Democracy, Anti-Revolutionary Party and the Christian Historical Union formed a Rump cabinet. Because the following negotiations for forming the next cabinet took rather long, the cabinet took further reaching decisions than a caretaker cabinet is usually supposed to do.

Cabinet Members

References

External links
Official

  Kabinet-Biesheuvel I en II Parlement & Politiek
  Kabinet-Biesheuvel Rijksoverheid

1972 establishments in the Netherlands
1973 disestablishments in the Netherlands
Cabinets established in 1972
Cabinets disestablished in 1973
Cabinets of the Netherlands
Caretaker governments
Minority governments